Iphigenia is a figure in Greek mythology.

Iphigenia may also refer to:

General
 Iphigenia (film), 1977 Greek film
 112 Iphigenia, asteroid
 Ephigenia, sainted daughter of Ethiopian king
 Iphigenia (bivalve), a bivalve mollusc genus in the family Donacidae
 Iphigenia (plant), a plant genus in the family Colchicaceae

Iphigenia in Aulis
 Iphigenia in Aulis, drama by Euripides
 Iphigénie, tragedy by Racine
 Iphigénie en Aulide, a 1774 opera by Gluck
 Ifigenia in Aulide (disambiguation), various operas

Iphigenia in Tauris
 Iphigenia in Tauris, drama by Euripides
 Iphigenia in Tauris (Goethe), drama by Goethe
 Iphigénie en Tauride (Gluck), a 1779 opera by Gluck
 Iphigénie en Tauride (Desmarets and Campra), a 1704 opera by Campra
 Iphigénie en Tauride (Piccinni), a 1781 opera by Piccinni
 Ifigenia in Tauride (disambiguation)

Other
 Iphigenia en Tracia (1747), zarzuela by José de Nebra
 Iphigenia in Brooklyn, solo cantata by P. D. Q. Bach
 For Cymon and Iphigenia, see The Decameron
 For the related painting by Frederic Leighton, see Cymon and Iphigenia
 Iphigenia in Crimea, 2017 verse play for radio by Tony Harrison

Ships named after Iphigenia
 French ship Iphigénie, several ships in the French Navy
 HMS Iphigenia, several ships in the Royal Navy